Finnkampen (Swedish, literally The Finn Battle), Suomi-Ruotsi-maaottelu (literally The Finland-Sweden match) or Ruotsi-ottelu (Sverigekampen, literally The Sweden Battle), is a yearly international athletics competition held between Sweden and Finland since 1925.

It is (since the late 1980s) the only annual athletics international with only two participating countries still held at a professional level. The two-day event attracts significant audiences, with a combined total of over 50,000 tickets sold for the 2011 competition. Three-time heptathlon world champion Carolina Klüft made her final international appearance for Sweden at the meeting in 2012.

Competition 

The competition is actually divided into two internationals, one for men and one for women. Youth competitions for men and women are also held. Each country provides their three best participants in each of the events, except for the relays where there are four participants (one team) from each country. Traditionally, the competitions have been arranged alternatively, with Finland hosting in even years and Sweden in odd years. This has changed few times in recent years, seeing one country arranging the international twice in a row a few times. The reasons for this include stadium renovations and major international competitions. Points are given to all contestants completing their event (no points are given to athletes who are disqualified, do not finish the event or don't get the result in field competitions), based on the final position in every event. Points given in each event are, from 1st to 6th place: 7-5-4-3-2-1, and in relays 1st and 2nd place are awarded with 5 and 2 points.

The competition may not be a world class one looking at the results, no single world record has been set, but there are few competitions in the world that are fiercer and more prestigious. This is most often seen in the middle-distance running, where tactics are more important than time, and these events have seen many foul tricks during the years, in 1992 resulting in the disqualification of all six runners in the men's 1500 metres event.

Another important aspect of the event is that it is a team competition. A competitor who manages to reach fourth place instead of a projected sixth place can be just as important, or even more important, for the end result as a "star" that secures the expected first place. A fight to the finish between competitor number five and six, half a lap behind the winner, can be just as important as the actual winner. The race is not over until the last competitor crosses the line. For many of the competitors the international is the most prestigious competition of the year.

The events in Finland have always been held in Helsinki, after 1939 at the Helsinki Olympic Stadium, but 2016 and 2018 events took place at Ratina Stadium in Tampere due to renovation of the Olympic Stadium. The Swedish events have mostly been held in Stockholm at the Stockholm Olympic Stadium. From 1999 until 2012 they were held in Gothenburg at the Ullevi Stadium because of larger spectator capacity.

Events

History 

Finnkampen was held for the first time in Helsinki in 1925, with one of the participants being the five-time Olympic champion in the 1924 Summer Olympics, Paavo Nurmi. Competitions were held in 1927, 1929 and 1931. After a pause of eight years the next competition was held in 1939, just before the outbreak of the Second World War, which led to the cancellation of the competition between 1941 and 1944. The 1940 competition was held as a triple event between Finland, Sweden and Germany, with only two athletes from each country competing in each event. The international has been continually held for men since 1945 and for women since 1964, although the first women's competition was held already in 1953.

1931 breakup 
The first competitions were very much influenced by the love-hate relationship between Sweden and Finland.
The 1931 event was a victory for Finland, but tensions at the track led to a knuckle fight between the runners-up in the 800 metres race.

At the banquet after the games, the new chairman of the Finnish athletics union and future president of Finland, Urho Kekkonen announced that Finland would no longer take part in the event. 
The tension was in a large part caused by Swedish attempts, spearheaded by Sigfrid Edström, the Swedish president of the IAAF and vice-president of the IOC, to have Paavo Nurmi declared a professional athlete, and thus banned from international competitions. After Kekkonen's speech Swedish efforts intensified, and Nurmi was banned from the 1932 Summer Olympics in Los Angeles.

It took eight years until 1939, before the Finns again decided to participate in the games, at the eve of the planned 1940 Summer Olympics in Helsinki.

Results

Totals 
 Men:   
Finland  46 – 36  Sweden
 Women: 
Finland  25 – 42  Sweden
 Total:
Finland  71 – 78  Sweden

Competition records

Men

Women

References

External links 
 Finnkampen - Swedish site
 Ruotsi-ottelu - Finnish site
 The event at SVT's open archive 

 
International athletics competitions
Athletics competitions in Finland
Athletics competitions in Sweden
Recurring sporting events established in 1925
Finland–Sweden relations
Inter-Nordic sports competitions
Team combination track and field competitions